Glossary of microelectronics manufacturing terms

This is a list of terms used in the manufacture of electronic micro-components. Many of the terms are already defined and explained in Wikipedia; this glossary is for looking up, comparing, and reviewing the terms. You can help enhance this page by adding new terms or clarifying definitions of existing ones.

 2.5D integration – an advanced integrated circuit packaging technology that bonds dies and/or chiplets onto an interposer for enclosure within a single package

 3D integration – an advanced semiconductor technology that incorporates multiple layers of circuitry into a single chip, integrated both vertically and horizontally

 3D-IC (also 3DIC or 3D IC) – Three-dimensional integrated circuit; an integrated circuit built with 3D integration

 advanced packaging – the aggregation and interconnection of components before traditional packaging

 ALD – see atomic layer deposition

 atomic layer deposition (ALD) – chemical vapor deposition process by which very thin films of a controlled composition are grown 

 back end of line (BEoL) – wafer processing steps from the creation of metal interconnect layers through the final etching step that creates pad openings (see also front end of line, far back end of line, post-fab)

 BEoL – see back end of line

 bonding – any of several technologies that attach one electronic circuit or component to another; see wire bonding, thermocompression bonding, flip chip, hybrid bonding, etc.

 breadboard – a construction base for prototyping of electronics

 bumping – the formation of microbumps on the surface of an electronic circuit in preparation for flip chip assembly

 carrier wafer – a wafer that is attached to dies, chiplets, or another wafer during intermediate steps, but is not a part of the finished device

 chip – an integrated circuit; may refer to either a bare die or a packaged device

 chip carrier – a package built to contain an integrated circuit

 chiplet – a small die designed to be integrated with other components within a single package

 chemical-mechanical polishing (CMP) – smoothing a surface with the combination of chemical and mechanical forces, using an abrasive/corrosive chemical slurry and a polishing pad

 circuit board – see printed circuit board

 class 10, class 100, etc. – a measure of the air quality in a cleanroom; class 10 means fewer than 10 airborne particles of size 0.5 μm or larger are permitted per cubic foot of air

 cleanroom (clean room) – a specialized manufacturing environment that maintains extremely low levels of particulates

 CMP – see chemical-mechanical polishing

 copper pillar – a type of microbump with embedded thin-film thermoelectric material

 deep reactive-ion etching (DRIE) – process that creates deep, steep-sided holes and trenches in a wafer or other substrate, typically with high aspect ratios

 dicing – cutting a processed semiconductor wafer into separate dies

 die – an unpackaged integrated circuit; a rectangular piece cut (diced) from a processed wafer

 die-to-die (also die-on-die) stacking – bonding and integrating individual bare dies atop one another

 die-to-wafer (also die-on-wafer) stacking – bonding and integrating dies onto a wafer before dicing the wafer

 doping – intentional introduction of impurities into a semiconductor material for the purpose of modulating its properties

 DRIE – see deep reactive-ion etching

 e-beam – see electron-beam processing

 EDA – see electronic design automation

 electron-beam processing (e-beam) – irradiation with high energy electrons for lithography, inspection, etc.

 electronic design automation (EDA) – software tools for designing electronic systems

 etching (etch, etch processing) – chemically removing layers from the surface of a wafer during semiconductor device fabrication

 fab – a semiconductor fabrication plant

 fan-out wafer-level packaging – an extension of wafer-level packaging in which the wafer is diced, dies are positioned on a carrier wafer and molded, and then a redistribution layer is added

 far back end of line (FBEoL) – after normal back end of line, additional in-fab processes to create RDL, copper pillars, microbumps, and other packaging-related structures (see also front end of line, back end of line, post-fab)

 FBEoL – see far back end of line

 FEoL – see front end of line

 flip chip – interconnecting electronic components by means of microbumps that have been deposited onto the contact pads

 front end of line (FEoL) – initial wafer processing steps up to (but not including) metal interconnect (see also back end of line, far back end of line, post-fab)

 heterogeneous integration – combining different types of integrated circuitry into a single device; differences may be in fabrication process, technology node, substrate, or function

 HIC - see hybrid integrated circuit

 hybrid bonding – a permanent bond that combines a dielectric bond with embedded metal to form interconnections

 hybrid integrated circuit (HIC) – a miniaturized circuit constructed of both semiconductor devices and passive components bonded to a substrate 

 IC – see integrated circuit

 integrated circuit (IC) – a miniature electronic circuit formed by microfabrication on semiconducting material, performing the same function as a larger circuit made from discrete components

 interconnect (n.) – wires or signal traces that carry electrical signals between the elements in an electronic device

 interposer – a small piece of semiconductor material (glass, silicon, or organic) built to host and interconnect two or more dies and/or chiplets in a single package

 lead – a metal structure connecting the circuitry inside a package with components outside the package

 lead frame (or leadframe) – a metal structure inside a package that connects the chip to its leads

 mask – see photomask

 MCM – see multi-chip module

 microbump – a very small solder ball that provides contact between two stacked physical layers of electronics

 microelectronics – the study and manufacture (or microfabrication) of very small electronic designs and components

 microfabrication – the process of fabricating miniature structures of sub-micron scale

 Moore’s Law – an observation by Gordon Moore that the transistor count per square inch on ICs doubled every year, and the prediction that it would continue to do so

 more than Moore – a catch-all phrase for technologies that attempt to bypass Moore’s Law, creating smaller, faster, or more powerful ICs without shrinking the size of the transistor

 multi-chip module (MCM) – an electronic assembly integrating multiple ICs, dies, chiplets, etc. onto a unifying substrate so that they can be treated as one IC

 nanofabrication – design and manufacture of devices with dimensions measured in nanometers

 node – see technology node

 optical mask – see photomask

 package – a chip carrier; a protective structure that holds an integrated circuit and provides connections to other components

 packaging – the final step in device fabrication, when the device is encapsulated in a protective package. 

 pad (contact pad or bond pad) – designated surface area on a printed circuit board or die where an electrical connection is to be made

 pad opening – a hole in the final passivation layer that exposes a pad

 parasitics (parasitic structures, parasitic elements) – unwanted intrinsic electrical elements that are created by proximity to actual circuit elements

 passivation layer – an oxide layer that isolates the underlying surface from electrical and chemical conditions

 PCB – see printed circuit board

 photolithography – a manufacturing process that uses light to transfer a geometric pattern from a photomask to a photoresist on the substrate

 photomask (optical mask) –  an opaque plate with holes or transparencies that allow light to shine through in a defined pattern

 photoresist – a light-sensitive material used in processes such as photolithography to form a patterned coating on a surface

 pitch – the distance between the centers of repeated elements

 planarization – a process that makes a surface planar (flat)

 polishing – see chemical-mechanical polishing

 post-fab – processes that occur after cleanroom fabrication is complete; performed outside of the cleanroom environment, often by another company

 printed circuit board (PCB) – a board that supports electrical or electronic components and connects them with etched traces and pads

 quilt packaging – a technology that makes electrically and mechanically robust chip-to-chip interconnections by using horizontal structures at the chip edges 

 redistribution layer (RDL) – an extra metal layer that makes the pads of an IC available in other locations of the chip

 reticle – a partial plate with holes or transparencies used in photolithography integrated circuit fabrication

 RDL – see redistribution layer

 semiconductor – a material with an electrical conductivity value falling between that of a conductor and an insulator; its resistivity falls as its temperature rises

 silicon – the semiconductor material used most frequently as a substrate in electronics

 silicon on insulator (SoI) – a layered silicon–insulator–silicon substrate

 SiP – see system in package

 SoC – see system on chip

 SoI – see silicon on insulator

 split-fab (split fabrication, split manufacturing) – performing FEoL wafer processing at one fab and BEoL at another

 sputtering (sputter deposition) – a thin film deposition method that erodes material from a target (source) onto a substrate

 stepper – a step-and-scan system used in photolithography

 substrate – the semiconductor material underlying the circuitry of an IC, usually silicon

 system in package (SiP) – a number of integrated circuits (chips or chiplets) enclosed in a single package that functions as a complete system

 system on chip (SoC) – a single IC that integrates all or most components of a computer or other electronic system

 technology node – an industry standard semiconductor manufacturing process generation defined by the minimum size of the transistor gate length

 thermocompression bonding – a bonding technique where two metal surfaces are brought into contact with simultaneous application of force and heat

 thin-film deposition – a technique for depositing a thin film of material onto a substrate or onto previously deposited layers; in IC manufacturing, the layers are insulators, semiconductors, and conductors

 through-silicon via (TSV) – a vertical electrical connection that pierces the (usually silicon) substrate

 trace (signal trace) – the microelectronic equivalent of a wire; a tiny strip of conductor (copper, aluminum, etc.) that carries power, ground, or signal horizontally across a circuit

 TSV – see through-silicon via

 via – a vertical electrical connection between layers in a circuit

 wafer – a disk of semiconductor material (usually silicon) on which electronic circuitry can be fabricated

 wafer-level packaging (WLP) – packaging ICs before they are diced, while they are still part of the wafer

 wafer-to-wafer (also wafer-on-wafer) stacking – bonding and integrating whole processed wafers atop one another before dicing the stack into dies

 wire bonding – using tiny wires to interconnect an IC or other semiconductor device with its package (see also thermocompression bonding, flip chip, hybrid bonding, etc.)

 WLP – see wafer-level packaging

Microelectronics manufacturing
Semiconductor device fabrication
Electronics manufacturing
Semiconductors
Engineering
Wikipedia glossaries using unordered lists